Marcuzzo is am Italian surname. Notable people with the surname include:

Giacinto-Boulos Marcuzzo (born 1945), Italian Roman Catholic Auxiliary Bishop of the Latin Patriarchate of Jerusalem 
Riccardo Marcuzzo (born 1992), Italian singer and songwriter

Italian-language surnames